Kentucky Route 716 (KY 716) is a , north–south highway running through Summit in Boyd County.

Route description
KY 716 begins at the intersection of Little Garner Road and U.S. Route 60 (US 60) in Summit. It turns north onto Summit Road, which it stays on for the rest of its route. The road passes the Federal Correctional Institution, Ashland. Just short of a railroad crossing, it intersects Roberts Road, which carries KY 3292. KY 716 crosses the railroad tracks and continues north. The route ends at KY 5.

Major intersections

References

External links

0716
0716